Uludaş (also, Uludash) is a village and municipality in the Qabala Rayon of Azerbaijan.  It has a population of 1,501.

References 

Populated places in Qabala District